Riya Shukla is an Indian actress. She made her film debut with Nil Battey Sannata, garnering her the Star Screen Awards best child artist award and was also nominated for Best female debut at Zee Cine Award. In 2020, she was seen as the lead Lavanya "Pinky" Kashyap/Bhardwaj in Colors TV's Naati Pinky Ki Lambi Love Story.

Early life and education 
Riya was born on 1 January 1998, hails from Indranagar, Lucknow, Uttar Pradesh, and completed her education from M.K.S.D. inter College, Lucknow.

Career 
Riya entered the entertainment world as a contestant with reality TV show Hindustan Ke Hunarbaaz.

In 2015, she made her film debut with Nil Battey Sannata as Appu. For this role she won best child artist at Star Screen Award. She also appeared in the films Hichki and 3rd Eye.

From 2020, was the lead character Lavanya "Pinky Kashyap/Bhardwaj" in Naati Pinky Ki Lambi Love Story. She also appeared in Netflix thriller Raat Akeli Hai as Chunni.

Filmography

Television

Films

References

External links

2000 births
21st-century Indian actresses
Living people
Actresses in Hindi television
Actresses from Uttar Pradesh
Indian film actors
People from Lucknow